Albert James Derrick (25 August 1862 – 23 December 1931) was an Australian philatelist who signed the Roll of Distinguished Philatelists in 1928.

References

Signatories to the Roll of Distinguished Philatelists
1862 births
1931 deaths
Australian philatelists
Place of birth missing